Leoni al sole is a 1961 Italian comedy drama film. It is the directorial debut of Vittorio Caprioli.

In 2008, the film was selected to enter the list of the 100 Italian films to be saved.

In 2008, it was restored and shown as part of the retrospective "Questi fantasmi: Cinema italiano ritrovato" at the 65th Venice International Film Festival.

Cast 

Vittorio Caprioli as Giugiú 
Franca Valeri as  Giulia 
Philippe Leroy as Mimí
Serena Vergano as Serena  
Carlo Giuffrè as Zazà 
Enzo Cannavale as the Commissioner
Anna Campori
Evi Marandi
Luciana Gilli
Mia Genberg
Pia Genberg

References

External links

Leoni al sole at Variety Distribution

1961 films
Italian comedy-drama films
Commedia all'italiana
1961 comedy-drama films
Films directed by Vittorio Caprioli
Films set in Campania
1961 directorial debut films
Films scored by Fiorenzo Carpi
1960s Italian-language films
1960s Italian films